The 1999 Vuelta a Murcia was the 15th edition of the Vuelta a Murcia cycle race and was held on 3 March to 7 March 1999. The race started and finished in Murcia. The race was won by Marco Pantani.

General classification

References

1999
1999 in Spanish road cycling
March 1999 sports events in Europe